The 1888–89 FA Cup was the 18th edition of the world's oldest football knockout competition, The Football Association Challenge Cup, or FA Cup.

Qualifying rounds
Following the formation of the Football League, this season saw the introduction qualifying rounds, with League clubs given the right to request automatic exemption to the first round proper.

For information on the matches played from the first qualifying round to the fourth qualifying round, see 1888–89 FA Cup qualifying rounds.

First round proper

Replays

Second round proper

Replay

Second replay

Third round proper

Semi-finals

Replay

Final

References
 FA Cup Results Archive

 
1888–89
1888–89 domestic association football cups
FA